Sébastien Grosjean and Fabrice Santoro were the defending champions but did not compete that year.

Mark Knowles and Daniel Nestor won in the final 7–5, 6–3 against Martin Damm and Cyril Suk.

Seeds

  Mark Knowles /  Daniel Nestor (champions)
  Martin Damm /  Cyril Suk (final)
  Paul Hanley /  Nenad Zimonjić (semifinals)
  Jared Palmer /  Pavel Vízner (semifinals)

Draw

External links
 Main Draw on ATP Archive

Open 13
2004 ATP Tour